Bautista Goyel Álvarez Domínguez (1933 – 16 September 2017) was a Spanish Galician nationalist politician and historian. He was born in San Amaro, Spain. Álvarez, who was a founding member of the Galician People's Union in 1964, also served as the Galician political party's President from 1964 through 1977.

Álvarez died of a heart attack on 16 September 2017 at his sister's home in Beariz, Spain at the age of 84.

References

External links

 Biography 

1933 births
2017 deaths
Galician Nationalist Bloc politicians
Spanish male writers
20th-century Spanish historians
Members of the 1st Parliament of Galicia
Members of the 3rd Parliament of Galicia
Members of the 4th Parliament of Galicia
Members of the 5th Parliament of Galicia
Members of the 6th Parliament of Galicia
Members of the 7th Parliament of Galicia
People from O Carballiño (comarca)